Yoshihito Miyazaki (born 8 April 1959) is a Japanese former international table tennis player.

Miyazaki won two bronze medals for Japan at the 1986 Asian Games in Seoul. He returned to Seoul for the 1988 Summer Olympics, where he finished fourth in his group for singles and third in doubles (with Seiji Ono).

External links

References

1959 births
Living people
Japanese male table tennis players
Olympic table tennis players of Japan
Table tennis players at the 1988 Summer Olympics
Asian Games medalists in table tennis
Asian Games bronze medalists for Japan
Medalists at the 1986 Asian Games
Table tennis players at the 1986 Asian Games